Elvie Dreeszen (August 7, 1920 – December 6, 1986) was an American politician who served in the Iowa Senate from the 24th district from 1981 to 1983.

He died on December 6, 1986, in Ida Grove, Iowa at age 66.

References

1920 births
1986 deaths
Republican Party Iowa state senators